The canton of Soissons-1 (before 2015: Soissons-Nord) is an administrative division in northern France. It consists of the northern part of the town of Soissons and its northern suburbs. At the French canton reorganisation which came into effect in March 2015, the canton was expanded from 11 to 15 communes:
Bagneux
Chavigny
Crouy
Cuffies
Cuisy-en-Almont
Juvigny
Leury
Osly-Courtil
Pasly
Pommiers
Soissons (partly)
Vauxrezis
Venizel
Villeneuve-Saint-Germain 
Vregny

Demographics

See also
Cantons of the Aisne department 
Communes of France

References

Cantons of Aisne